The Best is a compilation album by George Clinton and the P-Funk All Stars. The album was released in 1995 by P-Vine Records in Japan and features various tracks that were originally released on the George Clinton Family Series CDs. Unlike the Family Series CDs, "The Best" has never been released outside Japan and does not feature commentary from George Clinton.

Tracks

May Day (S.O.S.)-Funkadelic
Live Up-Parliament
Clone Communicado-Funkadelic
Love Is Something-Brides Of Funkenstein
Off The Wall-Jessica Cleaves
Can't Get Over Losing You-Junie Morrison
Michelle-Flastic Brain Flam
Lickity Split-Horny Horns
I Can't Stand It-Tracey Lewis and Andre Foxxe
Sunshine Of Your Love-Funk
Every Little Bit Hurts-George Clinton, Diane Brooks, and Funkadelic

George Clinton (funk musician) albums
1995 greatest hits albums